Esteban Montalvo (1896 – 1930), nicknamed "Mayarí", was a Cuban outfielder in the Negro leagues and Cuban League in the 1920s.

A native of Matanzas, Cuba, Montalvo made his Negro leagues debut in 1923 with the Cuban Stars (West). He played four seasons with the club, and also played for the Lincoln Giants in 1927. Montalvo also played for Almendares, Habana, and the Leopardos de Santa Clara of the Cuban League. He died in 1930 at age 33 or 34.

References

External links
 and Baseball-Reference Cuban and Black Baseball stats and Seamheads

1896 births
1930 deaths
Date of birth missing
Date of death missing
Place of death missing
Almendares (baseball) players
Cuban Stars (West) players
Habana players
Leopardos de Santa Clara players
Lincoln Giants players
Sportspeople from Matanzas
Baseball outfielders